Freedom is the name of several places in the U.S. state of Wisconsin:

Freedom, Forest County, Wisconsin, a town
Freedom, Outagamie County, Wisconsin, the largest town with the name Freedom in Wisconsin
Freedom (community), Outagamie County, Wisconsin, an unincorporated community
Freedom, Sauk County, Wisconsin, a town